McFadyen is a Scottish patronymic surname meaning "son of little Patrick".  The Gaelic prefix "Mc" means "son of", while "Fadyen" is a derivative of the Gaelic Pháidín, meaning "little Patrick". It is a variant of the surname McFadden.  There are similar names including MacFadyen and McFayden. People with the surname include:

List of persons with the surname
 Charles Hector McFadyen (1892–1965), Australian rules football player and senior public servant
 Don McFadyen (1907–1990), Canadian professional hockey left winger
 Hugh McFadyen (born 1967), Canadian lawyer and politician
 Ian McFadyen (born 1948), Australian writer, actor, and director
 John Edgar McFadyen (1870–1933), Scottish theologian and professor
 Ken McFadyen (born 1939), Australian war artist
 Liane Buffie McFadyen, Colorado politician
 Luke McFadyen (born 1982), Australian rugby player
Matthew Mcfadyen (born 1974), English actor

See also
 McFadden (surname)
 MacFadyen

References

Patronymic surnames